Cernătești is a commune in Dolj County, Oltenia, Romania. It is composed of five villages: Cernătești, Cornița, Rasnicu Bătrân, Rasnicu Oghian and Țiu.

References

Communes in Dolj County
Localities in Oltenia